Reichenau Abbey was a Benedictine monastery on Reichenau Island (known in Latin as Augia Dives). It was founded in 724 by the itinerant Saint Pirmin, who is said to have fled Spain ahead of the Moorish invaders, with patronage that included Charles Martel, and, more locally, Count Berthold of the Ahalolfinger and the Alemannian Duke Santfrid I (Nebi). Pirmin's conflict with Santfrid resulted in his leaving Reichenau in 727.

History
Reichenau quickly developed into an influential religious, cultural, and intellectual center.
Under Abbot Haito the monastery began to flourish. It gained influence in the Carolingian dynasty, under Abbot Waldo of Reichenau (740–814), by educating the clerks who staffed Imperial and ducal chanceries. Abbot Reginbert of Reichenau (died 846) built up the important book collection. Abbot Walahfrid Strabo (842–849), who was educated at Reichenau, was renowned as a poet and Latin scholar.

Reichenau was greatly fostered by its position on the highway to Italy, which was frequented by Greek and Italian, and even Irish and Icelandic pilgrims and wayfarers.
The Abbey stood along a main north–south highway between Germany and Italy, where the lake passage eased the arduous route. The Abbey of Reichenau housed a school, and a scriptorium and artists' workshop, that has a claim to having been the largest and artistically most influential centre for producing lavishly illuminated manuscripts in Europe during the late 10th and early 11th centuries, often known as the Reichenau School. An example of the scriptorium's production is the Pericopes of Henry II, made for the Emperor, now in Munich. Walafrid Strabo was educated at Reichenau.

Bishop Egino of Verona resided in Reichenau, and built (799) the parish church of St. Peter at Niederzell, a small Roman basilica with two towers, whither he retired to lead the life of a hermit, dying in 802. The patronage of the Carolingians resulted in the rapid growth of the monastery in importance, being granted successively immunity from secular authority, jurisdictio fori the status of a principality of the empire, and complete exemption from episcopal jurisdiction. Reichenau has preserved its precious relics, which include the pitcher from the wedding at Cana.

The Abbey reached its apex under Abbot Berno of Reichenau (1008–48). During his time, important scholars, such as Hermannus Contractus, lived and worked in Reichenau. In the second half of the 11th century, the cultural importance of the Abbey started to wane owing to the restrictive reforms of Pope Gregory VII, and also to rivalry with the nearby St. Gall; in 1540, the Bishop of Constance, an old rival of the Reichenau abbots, became lord of Reichenau, and, under the control of the succeeding bishops, the abbey's significance dwindled.

When the abbey lands were secularized (initially in 1757 and permanently in 1803) and the monks disbanded under Napoleon, part of Reichenau's famed library was preserved in the state library (Landesbibliothek) at Karlsruhe. The Geographus Bavarus and several other important documents may be found in the Bavarian State Library in Munich. Since 2001 a small community of Benedictines has been re-established at Niederzell (Sts. Peter and Paul). 

Because of its historical importance and exceptional art and architecture, Reichenau Abbey (along with other monuments on the island) was inscribed on the UNESCO World Heritage List in 2000.

Burials at the abbey
 Gerold of Vinzgau
 Charles the Fat
 Burchard III, Duke of Swabia
 Herman I, Duke of Swabia

See also
List of Merovingian monasteries

References

External links

724 establishments
1803 disestablishments in the Holy Roman Empire
Christian monasteries established in the 8th century
Christian monasteries disestablished in the 19th century
Religious organizations disestablished in 1803
States and territories established in the 720s
States and territories disestablished in the 1540s
Imperial abbeys
Monasteries in Baden-Württemberg
Benedictine monasteries in Germany
Merovingian architecture
Landmarks in Germany